Christian Del Bianco (born August 31, 1997) is a Canadian professional lacrosse goaltender playing for the Calgary Roughnecks of the National Lacrosse League (NLL). Drafted 15th overall in the second round in the 2015 NLL Entry Draft, he has played his entire NLL career in Calgary. In November 2022, he was re-signed for two more years to the end of the 2024 NLL season. 

Del Bianco was named to the NLL All-League 2nd Team in 2019. Heading into the 2023 NLL season, Inside Lacrosse named Del Bianco the #5 best goalie in the NLL.

Career statistics
Reference:

References 

1997 births
Living people
Calgary Roughnecks players
Canadian lacrosse players
Lacrosse goaltenders
People from Coquitlam
Sportspeople from British Columbia